William Spooner (1778 - 1857) was Archdeacon of Coventry from 1827 to 1851: this post was historically within the Diocese of Lichfield,  but during Spooner's tenure it moved on 24 January 1837 to the Diocese of Worcester.

Spooner was educated at St John's College, Oxford. He held incumbencies at Elmdon, Chipping Camden and Acle.

References

1778 births
1857 deaths
19th-century English Anglican priests
Alumni of St John's College, Oxford
Archdeacons of Coventry